IWA Histeria Boricua is an annual event that has been produced by the International Wrestling Association (IWA-PR) and other members of its conglomerate as a season opening event. It has been historically held during the first weeks of January, regularly coinciding with the celebration of Epiphany.

WWF/IWA Histeria Boricua 1999
The 1999 event was held on two locations: On January 5, 1999 at "Héctor Solá Bezares Coliseum" in Caguas, Puerto Rico, and On January 6, 1999 at "Juan Pachin Vicens Auditorium" on Ponce, Puerto Rico

WWF/IWA Histeria Boricua 2000
The 2000 event was held on two locations: On January 6, 2000 at "Palacio de Recreación y Deportes" in Mayaguez, Puerto Rico and On January 7, 2000 at "Ruben Rodriguez Coliseum" in Bayamón, Puerto Rico.

Histeria Boricua 2001

The 2001 event was held on three locations: On January 5, 2001 at "Acropolis de Manati" in Manati, Puerto Rico, On January 6, 2001 at "Héctor Solá Bezares Coliseum" in Caguas, Puerto Rico, On January 7, 2001 at "Roque Nido Coliseum" in Guayama, Puerto Rico.

Histeria Boricua 2002

The 2002 event was held on three (announced) locations: On January 4, 2002 at "Acropolis de Manati" in Manati, Puerto Rico, On January 5, 2002 at "Héctor Solá Bezares Coliseum" in Caguas, Puerto Rico and On January 6, 2002 in Bayamón, Puerto Rico.

IWA Histeria Boricua - Bayamón (2002)

Histeria Boricua 2003
The 2003 event was held at four locations: On January 3, 2003 in Yauco, Puerto Rico, On January 4, 2003 in Cayey, Puerto Rico, On January 5, 2003 in Mayaguez, Puerto Rico and On January 6, 2003 in Carolina, Puerto Rico.

Histeria Boricua 2004
The 2004 event was held On January 4, 2004 in Mayaguez, Puerto Rico, On January 5. 2004 in Cayey, Puerto Rico, On January 6, 2004 at "Ruben Rodriguez Coliseum" in Bayamón, Puerto Rico. The event in Bayamon was released on DVD which was one of the few events released on DVD by IWA

Histeria Boricua 2005
The 2005 event was held at four locations: On January 6, 2005 at "Roberto Clemente Coliseum" in San Juan, Puerto Rico, On January 7, 2005 at "San Sebastian Coliseum" in San Sebastian, Puerto Rico, On January 8 at "Cayey Coliseum" in Cayey, Puerto Rico and On January 9, 2005 at "San German Coliseum" in San German, Puerto Rico

Histeria Boricua 2006
The 2006 event was held On January 6, 2006 in Toa Baja, Puerto Rico, On January 7, 2006 at "Cayey Coliseum" in Cayey, Puerto Rico, and On January 8, 2006 at "Palacio de Recreacion y Deportes" in Mayaguez, Puerto Rico and other one (presumed) location.

Histeria Boricua 2007
The 2007 event was held at four locations: On January 4, 2007 at "Residencial Torres de Sabana" in Carolina, Puerto Rico, On January 5, 2007 at "Jose "Buga" Abreu Coliseum" in Isabela, Puerto Rico, On January 6, 2007 at "Ydelfonso Sola Morales Stadium" in Caguas, Puerto Rico and on January 7, 2007 at "Levittown Coliseum" in Levittown, Puerto Rico

Histeria Boricua 2008 
The 2008 event was held at three locations: On January 4, 2008 at "Dr. Pedro Albisu Campos Coliseum" in Yabucoa, Puerto Rico, On January 5, 2008 at "Raul Pipote Oliveras Coliseum" in Yauco, Puerto Rico, On January 6, 2008 at "Jose "Pepin" Cestero Court" in Bayamon, Puerto Rico.

Histeria Boricua 2009 
The 2009 event was held on January 6, 2009 at "Jose "Pepin" Cestero Court" in Bayamon, Puerto Rico

Histeria Boricua 2010 
The 2010 event was held on January 6, 2010 at "Jose "Pepin" Cestero Court" in Bayamon, Puerto Rico and a special event called "Histeria Boricua – La Revancha" On January 9, 2010 at "La Puntilla Court" in Cataño, Puerto Rico.

Histeria Boricua 2011 

The 2011 event was held on January 6, 2011 at "Jose "Pepin" Cestero Court" in Bayamon, Puerto Rico

IWA-FL Histeria Boricua 2019

As IWA-PR prepared to relaunch, anglo spinoff International Wrestling Association Florida (IWA-FL) announced that it would host Histeria Boricua this year. The event included the debut of Carly Colón under the IWA brand.

Histeria Boricua 2020

The return of the event to its home promotion was held at Coliseo Emilio E. Huyke in Humacao, Puerto Rico on March 7, 2020.

Histeria Boricua 2023

The 2023 was held at Rafael G. Amalbert Coliseum in Juncos, Puerto Rico, on January 6, 2023.

See also

Professional wrestling in Puerto Rico
List of professional wrestling promotions

References

1999 in professional wrestling
Professional wrestling shows
Professional wrestling in Puerto Rico